Freya's Love Songs is the third studio album of Taiwan-born Malaysian Mandopop artist Freya Lim. It was released on 3 August 2007 by Linfair Records.

While in between albums, Freya was working as a Radio DJ in Best Radio (好事聯播網). One of the programme segment focused on introducing English Oldies and the story behind the songs. Linfair Records hence decided that Freya's next album release should be an English album.

Track listing

References

2007 albums
Freya Lim albums
Mandopop albums